The unicorn is a legendary creature that has been described since antiquity as a beast with a single large, pointed, spiraling horn projecting from its forehead.

In European literature and art, the unicorn has for the last thousand years or so been depicted as a white horse-like or goat-like animal with a long straight horn with spiralling grooves, cloven hooves, and sometimes a goat's beard. In the Middle Ages and Renaissance, it was commonly described as an extremely wild woodland creature, a symbol of purity and grace, which could be captured only by a virgin. In encyclopedias, its horn was described as having the power to render poisoned water potable and to heal sickness. In medieval and Renaissance times, the tusk of the narwhal was sometimes sold as a unicorn horn.

A bovine type of unicorn is thought by some scholars to have been depicted in seals of the Bronze Age Indus Valley civilization, the interpretation remaining controversial.  An equine form of the unicorn was mentioned by the ancient Greeks in accounts of natural history by various writers, including Ctesias, Strabo, Pliny the Younger, Aelian, and Cosmas Indicopleustes. The Bible also describes an animal, the re'em, which some translations render as unicorn.

The unicorn continues to hold a place in popular culture. It is often used as a symbol of fantasy or rarity.

History

Indus Valley civilization
A creature with a single horn, conventionally called a unicorn, is the most common image on the soapstone stamp seals of the Bronze Age Indus Valley civilization ("IVC"), from the centuries around 2000 BC. It has a body more like a cow than a horse, and a curved horn that goes forward, then up at the tip. The mysterious feature depicted coming down from the front of the back is usually shown; it may represent a harness or other covering.  Typically the unicorn faces a vertical object with at least two stages; this is variously described as a "ritual offering stand", an incense burner, or a manger.  The animal is always in profile on Indus seals, but the theory that it represents animals with two horns, one hiding the other, is disproved by a (much smaller) number of small terracotta unicorns, probably toys, and the profile depictions of bulls, where both horns are clearly shown.  It is thought that the unicorn was the symbol of a powerful "clan or merchant community", but may also have had some religious significance.

In South Asia the unicorn is only seen during the IVC period — it disappears in South Asian art ever since. Jonathan Mark Kenoyer notes the IVC unicorn to not have any "direct connection" with later unicorn motifs observed in other parts of world; nonetheless it remains possible that the IVC unicorn had contributed to later myths of fantastical one-horned creatures in West Asia.

Classical antiquity 
Unicorns are not found in Greek mythology, but rather in the accounts of natural history, for Greek writers of natural history were convinced of the reality of unicorns, which they believed lived in India, a distant and fabulous realm for them. The earliest description is from Ctesias, who in his book Indika ("On India") described them as wild asses, fleet of foot, having a horn a cubit and a half in length, and colored white, red and black. Unicorn meat was said to be too bitter to eat.

Ctesias got his information while living in Persia. Unicorns on a relief sculpture have been found at the ancient Persian capital of Persepolis in Iran. Aristotle must be following Ctesias when he mentions two one-horned animals, the oryx (a kind of antelope) and the so-called "Indian ass" (ἰνδικὸς ὄνος). 
Antigonus of Carystus also wrote about the one-horned "Indian ass".
Strabo says that in the Caucasus there were one-horned horses with stag-like heads.
Pliny the Elder mentions the oryx and an Indian ox (perhaps a Greater one-horned rhinoceros) as one-horned beasts, as well as "a very fierce animal called the monoceros which has the head of the stag, the feet of the elephant, and the tail of the boar, while the rest of the body is like that of the horse; it makes a deep lowing noise, and has a single black horn, which projects from the middle of its forehead, two cubits [] in length." In On the Nature of Animals (Περὶ Ζῴων Ἰδιότητος, De natura animalium), Aelian, quoting Ctesias, adds that India produces also a one-horned horse (iii. 41; iv. 52), and says (xvi. 20) that the monoceros was sometimes called cartazonos, which may be a form of the Arabic karkadann, meaning "rhinoceros".

Cosmas Indicopleustes, a merchant of Alexandria who lived in the 6th century, made a voyage to India and subsequently wrote works on cosmography. He gives a description of a unicorn based on four brass figures in the palace of the King of Ethiopia. He states, from report, that "it is impossible to take this ferocious beast alive; and that all its strength lies in its horn. When it finds itself pursued and in danger of capture, it throws itself from a precipice, and turns so aptly in falling, that it receives all the shock upon the horn, and so escapes safe and sound".

Middle Ages and Renaissance 

Medieval knowledge of the fabulous beast stemmed from biblical and ancient sources, and the creature was variously represented as a kind of wild ass, goat, or horse.

The predecessor of the medieval bestiary, compiled in Late Antiquity and known as Physiologus (Φυσιολόγος), popularized an elaborate allegory in which a unicorn, trapped by a maiden (representing the Virgin Mary), stood for the Incarnation. As soon as the unicorn sees her, it lays its head on her lap and falls asleep. This became a basic emblematic tag that underlies medieval notions of the unicorn, justifying its appearance in both secular and religious art.  The unicorn is often shown hunted, raising parallels both with vulnerable virgins and sometimes the Passion of Christ. The myths refer to a beast with one horn that can only be tamed by a virgin; subsequently, some writers translated this into an allegory for Christ's relationship with the Virgin Mary.

The unicorn also figured in courtly terms: for some 13th-century French authors such as Thibaut of Champagne and Richard de Fournival, the lover is attracted to his lady as the unicorn is to the virgin. With the rise of humanism, the unicorn also acquired more orthodox secular meanings, emblematic of chaste love and faithful marriage. It plays this role in Petrarch's Triumph of Chastity, and on the reverse of Piero della Francesca's portrait of Battista Strozzi, paired with that of her husband Federico da Montefeltro (painted  1472–74), Bianca's triumphal car is drawn by a pair of unicorns.

However, when the unicorn appears in the medieval legend of Barlaam and Josaphat, ultimately derived from the life of the Buddha, it represents death, as the Golden Legend explains.  Unicorns in religious art largely disappeared after they were condemned by Molanus after the Council of Trent.

The unicorn, tamable only by a virgin woman, was well established in medieval lore by the time Marco Polo described them as "scarcely smaller than elephants. They have the hair of a buffalo and feet like an elephant's. They have a single large black horn in the middle of the forehead... They have a head like a wild boar's… They spend their time by preference wallowing in mud and slime. They are very ugly brutes to look at. They are not at all such as we describe them when we relate that they let themselves be captured by virgins, but clean contrary to our notions." It is clear that Marco Polo was describing a rhinoceros.

Alicorn 

The horn itself and the substance it was made of was called alicorn, and it was believed that the horn holds magical and medicinal properties. The Danish physician Ole Worm determined in 1638 that the alleged alicorns were the tusks of narwhals. Such beliefs were examined wittily and at length in 1646 by Sir Thomas Browne in his Pseudodoxia Epidemica.

False alicorn powder, made from the tusks of narwhals or horns of various animals, was sold in Europe for medicinal purposes as late as 1741. The alicorn was thought to cure many diseases and have the ability to detect poisons, and many physicians would make "cures" and sell them. Cups were made from alicorn for kings and given as a gift; these were usually made of ivory or walrus ivory. Entire horns were very precious in the Middle Ages and were often really the tusks of narwhals.

Entrapment 

One traditional method of hunting unicorns involved entrapment by a virgin.

In one of his notebooks Leonardo da Vinci wrote:
The unicorn, through its intemperance and not knowing how to control itself, for the love it bears to fair maidens forgets its ferocity and wildness; and laying aside all fear it will go up to a seated damsel and go to sleep in her lap, and thus the hunters take it.
The famous late Gothic series of seven tapestry hangings The Hunt of the Unicorn are a high point in European tapestry manufacture, combining both secular and religious themes. The tapestries now hang in the Cloisters division of the Metropolitan Museum of Art in New York City. In the series, richly dressed noblemen, accompanied by huntsmen and hounds, pursue a unicorn against mille-fleur backgrounds or settings of buildings and gardens. They bring the animal to bay with the help of a maiden who traps it with her charms, appear to kill it, and bring it back to a castle; in the last and most famous panel, "The Unicorn in Captivity", the unicorn is shown alive again and happy, chained to a pomegranate tree surrounded by a fence, in a field of flowers. Scholars conjecture that the red stains on its flanks are not blood but rather the juice from pomegranates, which were a symbol of fertility. However, the true meaning of the mysterious resurrected unicorn in the last panel is unclear. The series was woven about 1500 in the Low Countries, probably Brussels or Liège, for an unknown patron. A set of six engravings on the same theme, treated rather differently, were engraved by the French artist Jean Duvet in the 1540s.

Another famous set of six tapestries of Dame à la licorne ("Lady with the unicorn") in the Musée de Cluny, Paris, were also woven in the Southern Netherlands before 1500, and show the five senses (the gateways to temptation) and finally Love ("A mon seul desir" the legend reads), with unicorns featured in each piece. Facsimiles of these unicorn tapestries were woven for permanent display in Stirling Castle, Scotland, to take the place of a set recorded in the castle in a 16th-century inventory.

A rather rare, late-15th-century, variant depiction of the hortus conclusus in religious art combined the Annunciation to Mary with the themes of the Hunt of the Unicorn and Virgin and Unicorn, so popular in secular art. The unicorn already functioned as a symbol of the Incarnation and whether this meaning is intended in many prima facie secular depictions can be a difficult matter of scholarly interpretation. There is no such ambiguity in the scenes where the archangel Gabriel is shown blowing a horn, as hounds chase the unicorn into the Virgin's arms, and a little Christ Child descends on rays of light from God the Father. The Council of Trent finally banned this somewhat over-elaborated, if charming, depiction, partly on the grounds of realism, as no one now believed the unicorn to be a real animal.

Shakespeare scholars describe unicorns being captured by a hunter standing in front of a tree, the unicorn goaded into charging; the hunter would step aside the last moment and the unicorn would embed its horn deeply into the tree (See annotations of Timon of Athens, Act 4, scene 3, c. line 341: "wert thou the unicorn, pride and wrath would confound thee and make thine own self the conquest of thy fury".)

Heraldry 

In heraldry, a unicorn is often depicted as a horse with a goat's cloven hooves and beard, a lion's tail, and a slender, spiral horn on its forehead (non-equine attributes may be replaced with equine ones, as can be seen from the following gallery). Whether because it was an emblem of the Incarnation or of the fearsome animal passions of raw nature, the unicorn was not widely used in early heraldry, but became popular from the 15th century. Though sometimes shown collared and chained, which may be taken as an indication that it has been tamed or tempered, it is more usually shown collared with a broken chain attached, showing that it has broken free from its bondage.

Scotland 

In heraldry the unicorn is best known as a symbol of Scotland: the unicorn was believed to be the natural enemy of the lion – a symbol that the English royals had adopted around a hundred years before Two unicorns supported the royal arms of the King of Scots and Duke of Rothesay, and since the 1707 union of England and Scotland, the royal arms of the United Kingdom have been supported by a unicorn along with an English lion. Two versions of the royal arms exist: that used in Scotland gives more emphasis to the Scottish elements, placing the unicorn on the left and giving it a crown, whereas the version used in England and elsewhere gives the English elements more prominence. John Guillim, in his book; A Display of Heraldry, has illustrated the unicorn as a symbol of power, honor and respect.

Golden coins known as the unicorn and half-unicorn, both with a unicorn on the obverse, were used in Scotland in the 15th and 16th century. In the same realm, carved unicorns were often used as finials on the pillars of Mercat crosses, and denoted that the settlement was a royal burgh. Certain noblemen such as the Earl of Kinnoull were given special permission to use the unicorn in their arms, as an augmentation of honour.   The crest for Clan Cunningham bears a unicorn head.

Gallery 
Unicorns as heraldic charges:

Unicorns as supporters:

Queer culture 

By the beginning of the 21st Century, unicorns became a queer icon, second only to the rainbow flag, symbolizing queerness. The rainbow flag, created by American artist Gilbert Baker in 1978 as a joyous symbol of the diversity of the queer community, became prominent during the gay rights protests of the 1970s and 1980s. Unicorns, which were intrinsically linked to rainbows since the Victorian Era, became symbol of the queer community. 

There is no consensus on how the unicorn became a gay icon. Alice Fisher, an editor of Observer Design magazine, notes that the values of a unicorn – as rare and magical – have resulted in the word being used with various connotations. However, she argues that the Victorian association between rainbows and unicorns has resulted in unicorns becoming a queer icon. 

When directly asked, queer people give different answers. There are compelling stories about their own close personal relationship with unicorns. They often relate to one or more of the following aspects: uniqueness, magical quality, elusiveness and gender fluidity.

Queer individuals tend to relate to the unicorn because of their unique sexual orientation and gender identity. A New Orleans journalist, Tracey Anne Duncan, described her connection to unicorn when she watched The Last Unicorn as a child. In the film, the protagonist believed she was one of a kind throughout her life. Tracey was able to relate to that feeling, even though she didn't really know what "her kind" was at that time. 

The unicorn is an imaginary animal that lives in a world of myths and legends. Queer people, whose existence seems to blur the lines between societal norms of masculinity and femininity, may feel like they don't fully belong in this world. It explains their interests in mythical creatures such as unicorns, mermaids, and fairies.

Some argue that the gender fluidity of the unicorn makes it a suitable representation of the LGBT community. In ancient myths, the unicorn is portrayed as male, whereas in the modern times, it is depicted as a female creature.

Similar animals in religion and myth

Biblical 

An animal called the re'em is mentioned in several places in the Hebrew Bible, often as a metaphor representing strength. The allusions to the re'em as a wild, untamable animal of great strength and agility, with mighty horn or horns best fit the aurochs (Bos primigenius); this view is further supported by the Assyrian cognate word rimu, which is often used as a metaphor of strength, and is depicted as a powerful, fierce, wild mountain bull with large horns. This animal was often depicted in ancient Mesopotamian art in profile, with only one horn visible.

The translators of the Authorized King James Version of the Bible (1611) followed the Greek Septuagint (monokeros) and the Latin Vulgate (unicornis) and employed unicorn to translate re'em, providing a recognizable animal that was proverbial for its untamable nature. The American Standard Version translates this term "wild ox" in each case.

 "God brought them out of Egypt; he hath as it were the strength of an unicorn."—
 "God brought him forth out of Egypt; he hath as it were the strength of an unicorn."—
 "His glory is like the firstling of his bullock, and his horns are like the horns of unicorns: with them he shall push the people together to the ends of the earth."—
 "Will the unicorn be willing to serve thee, or abide by thy crib? Canst thou bind the unicorn with his band in the furrow? or will he harrow the valleys after thee? Wilt thou trust him, because his strength is great? or wilt thou leave thy labour to him? Wilt thou believe him, that he will bring home thy seed, and gather it into thy barn?"—
 "Save me from the lion's mouth; for thou hast heard me from the horns of unicorns."—
 "He maketh them [the cedars of Lebanon] also to skip like a calf; Lebanon and Sirion like a young unicorn."—
 "But my horn shalt thou exalt like the horn of the unicorn: I shall be anointed with fresh oil."—
 "And the unicorns shall come down with them, and the bullocks with their bulls; and their land shall be soaked with blood, and their dust made fat with fatness."—

The classical Jewish understanding of the Bible did not identify the Re'em animal as the unicorn. However, some rabbis in the Talmud debate the proposition that the Tahash animal (Exodus 25, 26, 35, 36 and 39; Numbers 4; and Ezekiel 16:10) was a domestic, single-horned kosher creature that existed in Moses' time, or that it was similar to the keresh animal described in Morris Jastrow's Talmudic dictionary as "a kind of antelope, unicorn".

Chinese mythology

The qilin, a creature in Chinese mythology, is sometimes called "the Chinese unicorn", and some ancient accounts describe a single horn as its defining feature. However, it is more accurately described as a hybrid animal that looks less unicorn than chimera, with the body of a deer, the head of a lion, green scales and a long forwardly-curved horn. The Japanese version (kirin) more closely resembles the Western unicorn, even though it is based on the Chinese qilin. The Quẻ Ly of Vietnamese myth, similarly sometimes mistranslated "unicorn" is a symbol of wealth and prosperity that made its first appearance during the Duong Dynasty, about 600 CE, to Emperor Duong Cao To, after a military victory which resulted in his conquest of Tây Nguyên. In November 2012 the History Institute of the DPRK Academy of Social Sciences, as well as the Korea News Service, reported that the Kiringul had been found, which is associated with a kirin ridden by King Dongmyeong of Goguryeo.

Beginning in the Ming Dynasty, the qilin became associated with giraffes, after Zheng He's voyage to East Africa brought a pair of the long-necked animals and introduced them at court in Nanjing as qilin. The resemblance to the qilin was noted in the giraffe's ossicones (bony protrusions from the skull resembling horns), graceful movements, and peaceful demeanor.

Shanhaijing (117) also mentioned Bo-horse, a chimera horse with ox tail, single horn, white body, and its sound like person calling. The creature is lived at Honest-head Mountain. Guo Pu in his jiangfu said that Bo-horse able to walk on water. Another similar creature also mentioned in Shanhaijing (80) to live in Mount Winding-Centre as Bo, but with black tail, tiger's teeth and claws, and also devour leopards and tigers.

See also 

 Al-mi'raj (unicorn-like creature in Islamic mythology)
 Bestiary
 Elasmotherium (extinct rhinoceros species known as "Siberian unicorn")
 Invisible Pink Unicorn (a modern satirical religious symbol)
 List of fictional horses
 List of unicorns
 Monoceros (constellation)
 Okapi (real animal once known as "African unicorn")
 Sin-you (mythology)
 Winged unicorn

References

Hall, James, A History of Ideas and Images in Italian Art, 1983, John Murray, London,

External links 

 American Museum of Natural History, Mythic Creatures: Unicorns, West and East
 Pascal Gratz, De Monocerote – Zur Rezeptionsgeschichte des Einhorns (PDF, German)
 David Badke, The Medieval Bestiary: Unicorn
 

 
National symbols of Scotland
National symbols of the United Kingdom
LGBT symbols
Human gender and sexuality symbols
Fairy tale stock characters